Local elections were held in Romania in 2000 with a runoff for mayors.

Electoral map

References

External links 

 Legislatia referitoare la alegerile locale din Romania
 Alegeri locale iunie 2000, Irina Andreea Cristea, ROMPRES, preluat de presalibera.ro

Local election, 2000
2000 elections in Romania